Alie Sesay (born 2 August 1994) is a professional footballer who currently plays as a centre-back for Hong Kong Premier League club Lee Man. Born in England, he represents the Sierra Leone national team.

Club career

Early career
Sesay was in the academy at Arsenal, before joining Leicester City in 2010. On 15 March 2013, he signed a professional contract with Leicester City, alongside Australian Callum Elder.

Colchester United (loan)
On 24 January 2014, Sesay joined Colchester United on loan for the rest of the season. Finally on 26 February, he made his debut for the club  in a 1–0 loss against Sheffield United coming as a 46th-minute substitute for Brian Wilson.

Cambridge United (loan)
In October 2015, Sesay joined League Two side Cambridge United on a one-month loan deal.

Barnet F.C.
Sesay signed for Barnet in an 18-month deal on 15 January 2016. He was released by mutual consent on 31 January 2017 after only five league appearances in the 2016–17 season.

IK Frej
After interest from AFC Eskilstuna in January 2017, Sesay joined IK Frej the following month. He departed the club midway through the 2018 season after playing a leading role and Captaining the team on several occasions.

Chania FC 
On 6 August 2018, Sesay joined Football League Greece side Chania. Sesay finished the season as the player of the year for Chania helping the team to 12 clean sheets in 25 of his appearances in the Greek Football League.

FC Arda Kardzhali
On 9 August 2019, Sesay joined Bulgarian First League side Arda Kardzhali on a two-year deal.

Zira FK
On 14 January 2020, Sesay joined Azerbaijan Premier League club Zira on an 18-month contract.

Sabail FK
On 31 January 2021, Sesay joined Azerbaijan Premier League side Sabail. He made his debut on 13 February, as a starter in a 3–0 defeat to Sumgayit.

Persebaya Surabaya
On 12 June 2021, Sesay joined Indonesian Liga 1 side Persebaya Surabaya. Sesay made his first-team debut on 11 September 2021 in a match against Persikabo 1973.

PSIS Semarang
Sesay is a player who completes the PSIS foreign legion 2022–23 Liga 1 season. This Sierra Leone national team player was brought in by PSIS management so that the back line was more solid.

Lee Man
On 20 January 2023, Sesay joined Lee Man.

International career
Sesay was called up by Sierra Leone for the first time in October 2014. He made his debut in a 2015 Africa Cup of Nations qualification match against Cameroon on 11 October 2014.

Career statistics

Club

International

Honours

Individual
 Liga 1 Team of the Season: 2021–22

References

External links
 
 

1993 births
Living people
People with acquired Sierra Leonean citizenship
Sierra Leonean footballers
Association football defenders
Association football midfielders
IK Frej players
AO Chania F.C. players
FC Arda Kardzhali players
Zira FK players
Sabail FK players
Persebaya Surabaya players
PSIS Semarang players
Lee Man FC players
Superettan players
Football League (Greece) players
First Professional Football League (Bulgaria) players
Azerbaijan Premier League players
Liga 1 (Indonesia) players
Hong Kong Premier League players
Sierra Leone international footballers
Sierra Leonean expatriate footballers
Sierra Leonean expatriate sportspeople in Sweden
Expatriate footballers in Sweden
Sierra Leonean expatriate sportspeople in Greece
Expatriate footballers in Greece
Sierra Leonean expatriates in Bulgaria
Expatriate footballers in Bulgaria
Sierra Leonean expatriate sportspeople in Azerbaijan
Expatriate footballers in Azerbaijan
Sierra Leonean expatriate sportspeople in Indonesia
Expatriate footballers in Indonesia
Expatriate footballers in Hong Kong
Footballers from Enfield, London
English footballers
Leicester City F.C. players
Colchester United F.C. players
Cambridge United F.C. players
Barnet F.C. players
English Football League players
English expatriate footballers
English expatriate sportspeople in Sweden
English expatriate sportspeople in Greece
English expatriate sportspeople in Bulgaria
English expatriate sportspeople in Azerbaijan
English expatriate sportspeople in Indonesia
English expatriate sportspeople in Hong Kong
English sportspeople of Sierra Leonean descent